Events from the year 1841 in Germany

Incumbents
 Kingdom of Prussia 
 Monarch – Friedrich Wilhelm IV (1840–1861)
 Kingdom of Bavaria
 Monarch – Ludwig I (1825–1848)
 Prime Minister – Karl von Abel (1837–1847)
 Kingdom of Saxony
 Frederick Augustus (1836–1854)
 Kingdom of Hanover– Ernest Augustus (1837–1851)
 Kingdom of Württemberg – William (1816–1864)

Events 
11 July – German emigrants set sail for Australia,  on the Skjold.

Births 
 February 24 – Carl Gräbe, German chemist (d. 1927)
 March 21 – Mathilde Blind, German-born English poet (died 1896)
 April 3 – Hermann Carl Vogel, German astrophysicist, astronomer (d. 1907)
 June 19 – Hermann Eduard von Holst, German historian (died 1904)
 August 12 – Franz Heinrich Schwechten, German architect (died 1924)

Deaths 
 February 21 – Dorothea Tieck, German translator (born 1799)
 May 23 – Franz Xaver von Baader, German philosopher, theologian (b. 1765)
 August 11 – Johann Friedrich Herbart, German philosopher (born 1776)
 October 9 – Karl Friedrich Schinkel, German architect (b. 1781)
 October 31 – Georg Anton Friedrich Ast, German philologist and philosopher (born 1778)

References

Bibliography

 Years of the 19th century in Germany
Germany
Germany